Youwarasan a/l Maniom (born 15 February 1993) is a Malaysian footballer who plays as a defender.

References

External links
 

1993 births
Living people
Malaysian footballers
Petaling Jaya City FC players
Malaysia Super League players
Tamil sportspeople
Malaysian people of Tamil descent
Association football defenders